Enquiring Minds II: The Soap Opera is the third and final solo studio album by American rapper Gangsta Boo. It was released on September 23, 2003 via Yorktown Records. The album is served as a sequel to her 1998 album Enquiring Minds.

Track listing

Chart history

References

External links

2003 albums
Sequel albums
Gangsta Boo albums
Albums produced by Drumma Boy